In the Chest of a Woman is a drama written by Efo Kodjo Mawugbe, a popular Ghanaian playwright. It was published in 2008 by Isaac Books & Stationery Services (IBSS) in Kumasi Ghana. It is a play in six parts, printed over 106 pages. It focused on women, male-female relationships, and female contributions to society.

Premise 
A play set in the Asante Empire, In the Chest of a Woman is about a woman who disguised her daughter as a boy so that she became the empire's king. The play revolves around the girl's difficulty in life after she grows.

References 

2008 fiction books
Ghanaian plays
2008 plays
Ghana in fiction